The ATP Challenger 175 tournaments are the highest tier of annual men's tennis tournaments on the ATP Challenger Tour, with 175 ranking points awarded to each singles champion.

Events

ATP Points

Singles champions

See also
 ATP Challenger Tour
 ATP Challenger Tour 125
 ATP Challenger Tour Finals
 ATP Tour

References

External links
 Association of Tennis Professionals (ATP) World Tour official website
 International Tennis Federation (ITF) official website